Owen Oglethorp may refer to:

 Owen Oglethorpe, bishop
Owen Oglethorp (MP) for Chipping Wycombe (UK Parliament constituency)